András Vasy (born 1969 in Hungary) is an American, Hungarian mathematician working in the areas of partial differential equations, microlocal analysis, scattering theory, and inverse problems. He is currently a professor of mathematics at Stanford University.

Education and career

Vasy attended Stanford University, obtaining his BS in Physics and MS in Mathematics in 1993. He received his PhD from MIT under the supervision of Richard B. Melrose in 1997. Following his postdoctoral appointment at the University of California, Berkeley, he joined the MIT faculty as an assistant professor in 1999. He was awarded tenure at MIT in 2005 during a long-term stay at Northwestern University before moving to Stanford in 2006.

Awards and honors 

Vasy was an Alfred P. Sloan Research Fellow from 2002 to 2004, and a Clay Research Fellow from 2004 to 2006. He was elected a Fellow of the American Mathematical Society in 2012. He was an invited speaker at the International Congress of Mathematicians in Seoul in 2014. In 2017, he was awarded the Bôcher Prize of the American Mathematical Society.

Research 

The unifying feature of Vasy's work is the application of tools from microlocal analysis to problems in hyperbolic partial differential or pseudo-differential equations. He analyzed the propagation of singularities for solutions of wave equations on manifolds with corners or more complicated boundary structures, partially in joint work with Richard Melrose and Jared Wunsch. For his paper on a unified approach to scattering theory on asymptotically hyperbolic spaces and spacetimes arising in Einstein's theory of general relativity such as de Sitter space and Kerr-de Sitter spacetimes, he was awarded the Bôcher Prize in 2017. This paper led to further advances, including the proof, by Vasy and Peter Hintz, of the global nonlinear stability of the Kerr-de Sitter family of black hole spacetimes, and a new proof of Smale's conjecture for Anosov flows by Semyon Dyatlov and Maciej Zworski. Vasy has also collaborated with Gunther Uhlmann on inverse problems for geodesic transforms.

References

1969 births
21st-century American mathematicians
21st-century Hungarian mathematicians
Living people
American relativity theorists
Stanford University alumni
Stanford University Department of Mathematics faculty
PDE theorists
Fellows of the American Mathematical Society